Franco Orlando Vezzoni (born 12 November 2001) is an Argentine professional footballer who plays as a midfielder for Italian  club Pro Patria, on loan from Inter Milan.

Club career
Born in Cosquín, Córdoba, Vezzoni joined Inter Milan Youth Sector at 16. In 2020, he was promoted to first team.

On 24 July 2021, he joined to Serie C club Pro Patria on loan. He made his professional debut on 29 September 2021 against Lecco. On 20 July 2022, Vezzoni re-joined Pro Patria for another season-long loan.

Career statistics

Club

References

External links
 
 

2001 births
Living people
Sportspeople from Córdoba Province, Argentina
Argentine footballers
Association football midfielders
Serie C players
Inter Milan players
Aurora Pro Patria 1919 players
Argentine expatriate footballers
Argentine expatriate sportspeople in Italy
Expatriate footballers in Italy